The 213th Army Division was created in February 1962 in Shenyang Military Region. It was a mountain infantry unit operating in Paektu Mountain region. On December 28, 1964 the division was renamed as 1st Independent Division of Jilin Provincial Military District(), and on February 29, 1976 it was further renamed as Independent Division of Jilin Provincial Military District() after the disbandment of 2nd Independent Division of Jilin Provincial Military District.

On October 31, 1980, a battalion from the Tank Regiment, 3rd Garrison Division of Shenyang Military Region was expanded as Tank Regiment of Independent Division and attached. 

On December 31, 1980 the division was renamed as 10th Garrison Division of Shenyang Military Region(). From December 1981 the division was under the control of 68th Army Corps. By then the division was composed of:
28th Garrison Regiment;
29th Garrison Regiment;
30th Garrison Regiment;
Tank Regiment;
Artillery Regiment.

In 1985 it was transferred to 16th Army after 68th Army Corps' disbandment.

On October 3, 1985 the divisional HQ moved to Yanji, Jilin. On November 6 its tank regiment was reduced as Independent Tank Battalion.

From 1990 the division was transferred to Jilin Provincial Military District's control.

The division was disbanded in October 1992.

References
中国各省军区独立师的历史沿革, https://web.archive.org/web/20160918225002/http://www.360doc.com/content/13/1205/20/1164894_334784330.shtml
中国人民解放军各步兵师沿革，http://blog.sina.com.cn/s/blog_a3f74a990101cp1q.html

GS10
Military units and formations disestablished in 1992
Military units and formations established in 1961